

The PIK-13 was a sailplane constructed in Finland to compete in the 1954 World Gliding Championships, held at Camphill Farm, Great Hucklow, UK. It was a conventional mid-wing design of "workmanlike" construction and underwent five test flights in the course of 1954 before its entry in the competition.

In the championships, the PIK-13 was flown by Antti Koskisen, who was placed 16th with 931 points. The PIK-13 was destroyed in an accident on 26 March 1956 when the control stick broke in flight. Pilot Jorma Jalkanen parachuted to safety.

Specifications

Notes

References
  
 
  
 
 
 
 
 

1950s Finnish sailplanes
PIK aircraft
Glider aircraft
Aircraft first flown in 1954
Mid-wing aircraft